Women's football in the Philippines started largely as an amateur sport. Its top tier league, the PFF Women's League, was largely composed of collegiate teams. The national team has competed in several editions of the AFC Women's Asian Cup.

History
Women's football in the Philippines along with its national team was institutionalized when the Philippine Ladies' Football Association (PLFA or PhiLFA) was established in 1980 by Cristina Ramos. The women's football association organized a league known as the Philippine Ladies' Football National League in 1981. The inaugural season was participated by eight teams mostly consisting of collegiate squads; Philippine Air Force, University of the Philippines Diliman, University of the Philippines Los Banos, Santos Tomas, Baguio Colleges Foundation, Ateneo de Manila University, Pasay Academy and Philippine Union College. University of the Philippines Diliman was the inaugural champions. The PLFA was eventually absorbed by the Philippine Football Federation (PFF).

There were previous attempts to establish a women's league in the Philippines. One such attempt was the Pinay Futbol League which folded in 2013. The following year the PFF organized the PFF Women's Cup. In 2016, the PFF launched the PFF Women's League as a follow up to the cup competition it launched two years prior.

An organization dedicated to women's football in the country, the Philippine Women's Football Association (PWFA) was established in July 2021. The PWFA intends to coordinate with the federation's existing women's department.

National competitions
The top-flight women's football league in the Philippines is the PFF Women's League. The 2016–2017 season was the inaugural season. PFF used to organize the PFF Women's Cup which held its last competition in 2015.

National team
The Philippine women's national team, also known by their nickname the Malditas (translated as Feisty ladies from Filipino) is organized by the Philippine Football Federation. They have regularly competed at the AFC Women's Championship with the Philippines hosting the 1999 edition until qualification phase was introduced in 2006. They returned to the continental tournament in 2019 (now known as the AFC Women's Asian Cup), when they qualified for the first time.

See also
 Football in the Philippines

References

 
Football in the Philippines